The premier of Quebec (French: premier ministre du Québec (masculine) or première ministre du Québec (feminine)) is the head of government of the Canadian province of Quebec. The current premier of Quebec is François Legault of the Coalition Avenir Québec, sworn in on October 18, 2018, following that year's election.

Selection and qualifications
The premier of Quebec is appointed as president of the Executive Council by the Lieutenant Governor of Quebec, the viceregal representative of the Queen in Right of Quebec. The premier is most usually the head of the party winning the most seats in the National Assembly of Quebec and is normally a sitting member of the National Assembly. An exception to this rule occurs when the winning party's leader fails to win a riding. In that case, the premier would have to attain a seat by winning a by-election. This has happened, for example, to Robert Bourassa in 1985.

The role of the premier of Quebec is to set the legislative priorities on the opening speech of the National Assembly. The premier represents the leading party and must have the confidence of the assembly, as expressed by votes on budgets and other matters considered as confidence votes.

The term "premier" is used in English, while French employs "premier ministre", which translates directly to "prime minister". In at least one instance, the term "Prime Minister of the Province of Quebec" was used in an English-language advertisement. The term is also used for the Podium Ceremony of the annual Formula One Grand Prix du Canada in Montreal.

See also
 Politics of Quebec
 List of premiers of Quebec by time in office
 Prime Minister of Canada
 Premier (Canada)

References

External links
 Premier of Quebec official site

Government of Quebec
1867 establishments in Quebec